Group X was a short-lived British artistic movement in the years after the First World War. Several of its members – among them Wyndham Lewis – had been part of the Vorticist movement before the War. The group held a single exhibition in 1920; others were planned, but never happened.

History 

In 1920 the former members of the pre-War Vorticist movement abruptly left the London Group, of which they had been part. Six of these artists – Jessica Dismorr, Frederick Etchells, Cuthbert Hamilton, Wyndham Lewis, William Roberts and Edward Wadsworth – were joined by the sculptor Frank Dobson, Charles Ginner, the American Edward McKnight Kauffer and John Turnbull to found Group X.

The group exhibited at the Mansard Gallery in Heal's in the Tottenham Court Road from 26 March – 24 April 1920.

References

Further reading 

 Charles Harrison (1981). English Art and Modernism 1900–1939. London: Allen Lane.

 
British art movements
1920 establishments in the United Kingdom
Vorticism